Franco Benedini (born 7 June 1978) is an Italian sprint canoer who has competed since the mid-2000s. He won a bronze medal in the K-4 500 m at the 2005 ICF Canoe Sprint World Championships in Zagreb.

Benedini also finished fourth in the K-4 1000 m event at the 2008 Summer Olympics in Beijing.

References

1978 births
Canoeists at the 2008 Summer Olympics
Italian male canoeists
Living people
Olympic canoeists of Italy
ICF Canoe Sprint World Championships medalists in kayak